Kim Soo-kyung may refer to:

 Kim Soo-kyung (baseball) (born 1979), South Korean male baseball player
 Kim Soo-kyung (weightlifter) (born 1985), South Korean female weightlifter